Supiri Andare is a 2014 Sri Lankan Sinhala comedy film directed by Michel Fonseka and co-produced by Krishan Dilipa Perera and Placidus I. Fernando for KPL Baiscope Films. It stars Tennyson Cooray, Sanoja Bibile, and Rodney Warnakula in lead roles along with Wimal Kumara de Costa, Tissa Wijesurendra and Dayasiri Hettiarachchi. It is the 1205th Sri Lankan film in the Sinhala cinema. This film is the acting debut for Lakshika Jayawardana.

Plot

Cast
 Tennyson Cooray as Gulliver / Andare
 Sanoja Bibile as Juhi Chawla
 Rodney Warnakula as Salman Khan
 Lakshika Jayawardana as Madhuri Dixit
 Tissa Wijesurendra as Shahrukh Khan
 Wimal Kumara de Costa as Baby
 Devinda Marcus
 Dayasiri Hettiarachchi

Soundtrack

References

2014 films
2010s Sinhala-language films